Stertor, from Latin 'stertere' to snore, and first used in 1804, is a noisy breathing sound like snoring. It is caused by partial obstruction of the upper airways, at the level of the pharynx and nasopharynx.

It is distinguished from stridor by its pitch. Stertor is low-pitched, and can occur when breathing in, out or both. Stertor and stridor can occur together, such as when adenotonsillar hypertrophy and laryngomalacia occur together.

References

Respiration